Arthur Delworth Hancock (January 28, 1905 – death date unknown) was an American Negro league first baseman in the 1920s.

A native of Lexington, Missouri, Hancock was the brother of fellow Negro leaguer Charlie Hancock. He played for the Cleveland Elites in 1926, and for the Cleveland Hornets the following season.

References

External links
 and Seamheads

1905 births
Year of death missing
Place of death missing
Cleveland Elites players
Cleveland Hornets players